Chingiz Sembaiuly Yesenamanov (
born ) is a Kazakhstani futsal player who is a universal player for AFC Kairat and the Kazakhstan national futsal team.

References

External links
AFC Kairat profile
The Final Ball profile

1989 births
Living people
Kazakhstani men's futsal players